The Soul of Kura San is a lost 1916 American drama silent film directed by Edward LeSaint and written by Charles Sarver. The film stars Sessue Hayakawa, Myrtle Stedman, Tsuru Aoki, George Webb, Kisaburo Kurihara and George Kuwa. The film was released on October 30, 1916, by Paramount Pictures.

Plot

Cast 
Sessue Hayakawa as Toyo
Myrtle Stedman as Anne Willoughby
Tsuru Aoki as Kura-San
George Webb as Herbert Graham
Kisaburô Kurihara as Naguchi
George Kuwa as Oki

References

External links 
 

1916 films
1910s English-language films
Silent American drama films
1916 drama films
Paramount Pictures films
Films directed by Edward LeSaint
American black-and-white films
American silent feature films
Lost American films
Japan in non-Japanese culture
1916 lost films
Lost drama films
1910s American films